Michael Davies (born 18 August 1962), also known by the nickname of "Dio", is a Welsh former professional rugby league footballer who played in the 1980s.

International honours
Mike Davies won a cap for Wales while at Cardiff City (Bridgend) Blue Dragons in 1984.

Note
Before the start of the 1984/85 season, Cardiff City Blue Dragons relocated from Ninian Park in Cardiff, to Coychurch Road Ground in Bridgend, and were renamed Bridgend Blue Dragons.

References

1962 births
Living people
Cardiff City Blue Dragons players
Place of birth missing (living people)
Rugby league centres
Wales national rugby league team players
Welsh rugby league players